The 1938 Buffalo Bulls football team was an American football team that represented the University of Buffalo as an independent during the 1938 college football season. In their third season under head coach Jim Peele, the Bulls compiled a 2–6 record and was outscored by a total of 156 to 81. The team played its home games at Rotary Field in Buffalo, New York.

Schedule

References

Buffalo
Buffalo Bulls football seasons
Buffalo Bulls football